Frederick Harry Tonkin (March 31, 1875 – May 20, 1938) was an American politician in the state of Washington. He served in the Washington House of Representatives from 1917 to 1933.

References

Republican Party members of the Washington House of Representatives
1875 births
1938 deaths
People born at sea
20th-century American politicians